Mania (German: Mania. Die Geschichte einer Zigarettenarbeiterin) is a 1918 German silent drama film directed by Eugen Illés and starring Pola Negri, Arthur Schröder and Ernst Wendt.

The film's sets were designed by the art director Paul Leni.

Cast
 Pola Negri as Mania - Zigarettenarbeiterin 
 Arthur Schröder as Hans van der Hof, Tondichter 
 Ernst Wendt as Kunstmaler 
 Werner Hollmann as Morelli, reicher Kunstmäcen

References

Bibliography
 Mariusz Kotowski. Pola Negri: Hollywood's First Femme Fatale. University Press of Kentucky, 2014.

External links

1918 films
Films of the Weimar Republic
German silent feature films
Films directed by Eugen Illés
German black-and-white films
UFA GmbH films
German drama films
1918 drama films
Silent drama films
1910s German films
1910s German-language films